Gomoku, also called Five in a Row, is an abstract strategy board game. It is traditionally played with Go pieces (black and white stones) on a Go board. It is played using a 15×15 board while in the past a 19×19 board was standard. Because pieces are typically not moved or removed from the board, gomoku may also be played as a paper-and-pencil game. The game is known in several countries under different names.

Rules
Players alternate turns placing a stone of their color on an empty intersection. Black plays first. The winner is the first player to form an unbroken line of five stones of their color horizontally, vertically, or diagonally. In some rules, this line must be exactly five stones long; six or more stones in a row does not count as a win, and is called an overline. If the board is completely filled and no one can make a line of 5 stones, then it will result in a draw.

Origin
Gomoku has existed in Japan since before the Meiji Restoration (1868). Go means five, moku is a counter word for pieces and narabe means line-up. The game is popular in China, where it is called Wuziqi (五子棋). Wu (五 wǔ) means five, zi (子 zǐ) means piece, and qi (棋 qí) refers to a board game category in Chinese. The game is also popular in Korea, where it is called omok (오목 [五目]) which has the same structure and origin as the Japanese name.

In the nineteenth century, the game was introduced to Britain where it was known as Go Bang, said to be a corruption of the Japanese word goban, which was itself adapted from the Chinese k'i pan (qí pán) "go-board."<ref>OED citations: 1886 GUILLEMARD Cruise 'Marchesa I. 267 Some of the games are purely Japanese..as go-ban. Note, This game is the one lately introduced into England under the misspelt name of Go Bang. 1888''' Pall Mall Gazette 1. Nov. 3/1 These young persons...played go-bang and cat's cradle.
The board below shows the three types of winning arrangements as they might appear on an 8x8 Petteia board. Obviously the cramped conditions would result in a draw most of the time, depending on the rules. Play would be easier on a larger Latrunculi board of 12x8 or even 10x11.
.</ref>

 First player advantage 
Gomoku has a strong advantage for the first player when unrestricted.

Championships in gomoku previously used the "Pro" opening rule, which mandated that the first player place the first stone in the center of the board. The second player's stone placement was unrestricted. The first player's second stone had to be placed at least three intersections away from the first player's first stone. This rule was used in the 1989 and 1991 world championships. When the win–loss ratio of these two championships was calculated, the first player (black) won 67 percent of games.

This was deemed too unbalanced for tournament play, so tournament gomoku adopted the Swap2 opening protocol in 2009. In Swap2, the first player places three stones, two black and one white, on the board. The second player then selects one of three options: play as black, play as white and place another white stone, or place two more stones, one white and one black, and let the first player choose the color.

The win ratio of the first player has been calculated to be around 52 percent using the Swap2 opening protocol, greatly balancing the game and largely solving the first-player advantage.

Variants

 Freestyle gomoku 
Freestyle gomoku has no restrictions on either player and allows a player to win by creating a line of five or more stones, with each player alternating turns placing one stone at a time.

 Renju 
Black (the player who makes the first move) has long been known to have an advantage, even before L. Victor Allis proved that black can force a win (see below). Renju attempts to mitigate this imbalance with extra rules that aim to reduce black's first player advantage.

It is played on a 15×15 board, with the rules of three and three, four and four, and overlines applied to Black only.
 The rule of three and three bans a move that simultaneously forms two open rows of three stones (rows not blocked by an opponent's stone at either end).
 The rule of four and four bans a move that simultaneously forms two rows of four stones (open or not).
Overlines prevent a player from winning if they form a line of 6 or more stones.
Renju also makes use of various tournament opening rules, such as Soosõrv-8, the current international standard.

 Caro 
In Caro, (also called gomoku+, popular among Vietnamese), the winner must have an overline or an unbroken row of five stones that is not blocked at either end (overlines are immune to this rule). This makes the game more balanced and provides more power for White to defend.

 Omok 
Omok is similar to Freestyle gomoku; however, it is played on a 19×19 board and includes the rule of three and three.Sungjin, Nam. "Omok." Encyclopedia of Korean Folk Culture, National Folk Museum of Korea, https://web.archive.org/web/20210722180119/https://folkency.nfm.go.kr/en/topic/detail/1587 . Accessed 22 July 2021.

 Ninuki-renju 
Also called Wu, Ninuki Renju is a variant which adds capturing to the game; A pair of stones of the same color may be captured by the opponent by means of custodial capture (sandwiching a line of two stones lengthwise). The winner is the player either to make a perfect five in a row, or to capture five pairs of the opponent's stones. It uses a 15x15 board and the rules of three and three and overlines. It also allows the game to continue after a player has formed a row of five stones if their opponent can capture a pair across the line.

 Pente 
Pente is related to Ninuki-Renju, and has the same custodial capture method, but is most often played on a 19x19 board and does not use the rules of three and three, four and four, or overlines.

 Tournament Opening Rules 
Tournament rules are used in professional play to balance the game and mitigate the first player advantage. The tournament rule used for the gomoku world championships since 2009 is the Swap2 opening rule.

 Pro 
The first player's first stone must be placed in the center of the board. The second player's first stone may be placed anywhere on the board. The first player's second stone must be placed at least three intersections away from the first stone (two empty intersections in between the two stones).

 Long Pro 
The first player's first stone must be placed in the center of the board. The second player's first stone may be placed anywhere on the board. The first player's second stone must be placed at least four intersections away from the first stone (three empty intersections in between the two stones).

 Swap 
The tentative first player places three stones (two black, and one white) anywhere on the board. The tentative second player then chooses which color to play as. Play proceeds from there as normal with white playing their second stone.

 Swap2 
The tentative first player places three stones on the board, two black and one white. The tentative second player then has three options:

 They can choose to play as white and place a second white stone
 They can swap their color and choose to play as black
 Or they can place two more stones, one black and one white, and pass the choice of which color to play back to the tentative first player.

Because the tentative first player doesn't know where the tentative second player will place the additional stones if they take option 3, the swap2 opening protocol limits excessive studying of a line by only one of the players.

 Theoretical generalizations 
m,n,k-games are a generalization of gomoku to a board with m×n intersections, and k in a row needed to win.

Connect(m,n,k,p,q) games are another generalization of gomoku to a board with m×n intersections, k in a row needed to win, p stones for each player to place, and q stones for the first player to place for the first move only. Each player may play only at the lowest unoccupied place in a column. In particular, Connect(m,n'',6,2,1) is called Connect6.

Example game

This game on the 15×15 board is adapted from the paper "Go-Moku and Threat-Space Search".

The opening moves show clearly black's advantage. An open row of three (one that is not blocked by an opponent's stone at either end) has to be blocked immediately, or countered with a threat elsewhere on the board. If not blocked or countered, the open row of three will be extended to an open row of four, which threatens to win in two ways.

White has to block open rows of three at moves 10, 14, 16 and 20, but black only has to do so at move 9.
Move 20 is a blunder for white (it should have been played next to black 19). Black can now force a win against any defense by white, starting with move 21.

There are two forcing sequences for black, depending on whether white 22 is played next to black 15 or black 21. The diagram on the right shows the first sequence. All the moves for white are forced. Such long forcing sequences are typical in gomoku, and expert players can read out forcing sequences of 20 to 40 moves rapidly and accurately.

The diagram on the right shows the second forcing sequence. This diagram shows why white 20 was a blunder; if it had been next to black 19 (at the position of move 32 in this diagram) then black 31 would not be a threat and so the forcing sequence would fail.

World championships
World Gomoku Championships have occurred 2 times in 1989, 1991.
Since 2009 tournament play has resumed, with the opening rule changed to swap2.

List of the tournaments occurred and title holders follows.

Computers and gomoku 
Researchers have been applying artificial intelligence techniques on playing gomoku for several decades. In 1994, L. Victor Allis raised the algorithm of proof-number search (pn-search) and dependency-based search (db-search), and proved that when starting from an empty 15×15 board, the first player has a winning strategy using these searching algorithms. This applies to both free-style gomoku and standard gomoku without any opening rules. It seems very likely that black wins on larger boards too. In any size of a board, freestyle gomoku is an m,n,k-game, hence it is known that the first player can force a win or a draw. In 2001, Allis' winning strategy was also approved for renju, a variation of gomoku, when there was no limitation on the opening stage.

However, neither the theoretical values of all legal positions, nor the opening rules such as Swap2 used by the professional gomoku players have been solved yet, so the topic of gomoku artificial intelligence is still a challenge for computer scientists, such as the problem on how to improve the gomoku algorithms to make them more strategic and competitive. Nowadays, most of the state-of-the-art gomoku algorithms are based on the alpha-beta pruning framework.

Reisch proved that Generalized gomoku is PSPACE-complete. He also observed that the reduction can be adapted to the rules of k-in-a-Row for fixed k. Although he did not specify exactly which values of k are allowed, the reduction would appear to generalize to any k ≥ 5.

There exist several well-known tournaments for gomoku programs since 1989. The Computer Olympiad started with the gomoku game in 1989, but gomoku has not been in the list since 1993. The Renju World Computer Championship was started in 1991, and held for 4 times until 2004. The Gomocup tournament is played since 2000 and taking place every year, still active now, with more than 30 participants from about 10 countries. The Hungarian Computer Go-Moku Tournament was also played twice in 2005. There were also two Computer vs. Human tournaments played in the Czech Republic, in 2006 and 2011. Not until 2017 were the computer programs proved to be able to outperform the world human champion in public competitions. In the Gomoku World Championship 2017, there was a match between the world champion program Yixin and the world champion human player Rudolf Dupszki. Yixin won the match with a score of 2–0.

In popular culture 
Gomoku was featured in a 2018 Korean drama by Baek Seung-Hwa starring Park Se-wan. The film follows Baduk Lee (Park Se-wan), a former go prodigy who retired after a humiliating loss on time. Years later, Baduk Lee works part time at a go club, where she meets Ahn Kyung Kim, who introduces her to an Omok (Korean gomoku) tournament. Lee is initially uninterested and considers Omok a children's game, but after her roommate loses money on an impulse purchase, she enters the tournament for the prize money and loses badly, being humiliated once again. Afterwards, she begins training to redeem herself and becomes a serious omok player.

See also
 Renju
 Pente
 Pegity
 Connect6
 Connection game
 Reversi

References

Further reading
 Five-in-a-Row (Renju) For Beginners to Advanced Players

External links
 Gomoku World
 Renju International Federation website
 Gomocup tournament

Abstract strategy games
Traditional board games
Japanese games
Japanese inventions
Paper-and-pencil games
PSPACE-complete problems
In-a-row games
Solved games
Games played on Go boards